Isernia Football Club, shortened as Isernia, is an Italian association football club based in the city of Isernia, Molise. The club currently plays in Serie D. Their nickname is "pentri" (this is the name of most important tribe of the Samnites). They play their home matches at Stadio Mario Lancellotta.

History

Foundation 
Founded in 1928 as Samnium Isernia; Isernia F.C. spent the majority of its history in semi-professional and regional levels of Italian football. In the seasons 1984–85, 1985–86 and 2003–04, Isernia played in Serie C2 (currently Lega Pro Seconda Divisione), the 4th Italian professional football level.

Re-foundations

From Sporting Isernia to Sporting Aesernia 
Failed in 2004, it was immediately re-founded as A.S.D. Sporting Isernia that in 2007 was merged with A.S.D. Aesernia founding A.S.D. Sporting Aesernia.

From Real Isernia to Isernia F.C. 
In summer 2009 the new club that played in Promozione was merged with A.S.D. Real Rocca d'Evandro 2006 of Scapoli, in Eccellenza Molise, founding A.S.D. Real Isernia.

First classified in 2010–11 Eccellenza Molise, in the summer 2011 the club was renamed Isernia F.C. playing from the 2011–2012 season in Serie D.

Colours and badge 
Its colours are white and sky blue.

Rivalries & Friendships 
Founded in 1994, Cherokee is the club's biggest ultras group.
Isernia have a strong rivalry with  Cassino and Vasto but their main rivals are the neighbours Campobasso, Termoli and Venafro. 
Conversely the ultras have friendly relationships with Manfredonia, Terracina, Maceratese and Torcida Visinie (Rapid București) .

Stadium 
The home ground is the Stadio Mario Lancellotta.

Notes and references

External links 
 Isernia official website
 Isernia Supporters website

 
Isernia
Association football clubs established in 1928
Serie C clubs
1928 establishments in Italy